Andrey Vitalyevich Yeliseyev (born 22 May 1991) is a Russian football midfielder. He plays for FC Irtysh Omsk.

Club career
He made his debut in the Russian Second Division for FC Znamya Truda Orekhovo-Zuyevo on 21 April 2011 in a game against FC Saturn-2 Moscow Oblast.

He made his Russian Football National League debut for FC Baltika Kaliningrad on 11 July 2016 in a game against FC Shinnik Yaroslavl.

References

1991 births
Association football midfielders
Sportspeople from Perm, Russia
Living people
Russian footballers
FC Baltika Kaliningrad players
FC Zenit-Izhevsk players
FC Znamya Truda Orekhovo-Zuyevo players
FC Zvezda Perm players
FC Nosta Novotroitsk players
FC Chita players
FC Dinamo-Auto Tiraspol players
FC Irtysh Omsk players
Russian Second League players
Russian First League players
Moldovan Super Liga players
Russian expatriate footballers
Expatriate footballers in Moldova
Russian expatriate sportspeople in Moldova